Tajikistan has its system of football leagues. There are four levels of football leagues in Tajikistan.

External links and sources
 Tajikistan Football League Organization official website
  Tajikistan Football Federation official website
 В ДОБРЫЙ ПУТЬ, ЧЕМПИОНАТ ТАДЖИКИСТАНА-2017!

 Football in Tajikistan
 
Tajikistan